Mossberg and Mosberg are surnames. Notable people with the surname include:

 Assar Mossberg (fl. 1930s), Swedish footballer
 Bo Mossberg (contemporary), Swedish author and illustrator of Den nya nordiska floran
 Daniel Mossberg (born 1981), Swedish professional bandy midfielder
 Edward Mosberg (1926-2022), Polish-American Holocaust survivor, educator, and philanthropist
 Fredrik Mossberg (1874–1950), Swedish sports shooter
 Irving Mosberg (1908–1973), American politician and judge
 Joel Mossberg (1870–1943), Swedish-American singer
 Mathew Mossburg (born 1967), American business owner and former legislator in Maryland
 Samuel Mosberg (1896–1967), American professional boxer
 Thomas W. Mossberg (1951– ), American physicist
 Walter Mossberg (born 1947),  American journalist, well-known as a Wall Street Journal columnist

See also 
 Moosberg, a hill in Lower Saxony, Germany
 Herman T. Mossberg Residence, a house in South Bend, Indiana, United States
 O.F. Mossberg & Sons, an American firearms manufacturer